Machang Subdistrict is a subdistrict located on the northwestern corner of Hexi District, Tianjin, China. It shares border with Xinxing and Taoyuan Subdistricts to its north, Xiuyue Road Subdistrict to its east, Tianta and Youyi Road Subdistricts to its south, as well as Shuishang Gongyuan and Xuefu Subdistrict to its west. Its population was 54,949 as of 2010.

The subdistrict was established in 1954. Its name came from a horse racing venue that was constructed here in 1890s, back when this region was a part of the British concession of Tianjin.

Administrative divisions 
So far in 2021, Machang Subdistrict consists of 10 communities, which are listed as follows:

Gallery

References 

Township-level divisions of Tianjin
Hexi District, Tianjin